Afanasyevo is the name of several inhabited localities in Russia.

Urban localities
Afanasyevo, Kirov Oblast, an urban-type settlement in Afanasyevsky District of Kirov Oblast

Rural localities
Afanasyevo, Ivanovo Oblast, a selo in Komsomolsky District of Ivanovo Oblast
Afanasyevo, Kaluga Oblast, a village in Peremyshlsky District of Kaluga Oblast
Afanasyevo, Chukhlomsky District, Kostroma Oblast, a village in Nozhkinskoye Settlement of Chukhlomsky District of Kostroma Oblast
Afanasyevo, Manturovsky District, Kostroma Oblast, a village in Leontyevskoye Settlement of Manturovsky District of Kostroma Oblast
Afanasyevo, Kursk Oblast, a selo in Afanasyevsky Selsoviet of Oboyansky District of Kursk Oblast
Afanasyevo, Lipetsk Oblast, a selo in Afanasyevsky Selsoviet of Izmalkovsky District of Lipetsk Oblast
Afanasyevo, Kolomensky District, Moscow Oblast, a village in Zarudenskoye Rural Settlement of Kolomensky District of Moscow Oblast
Afanasyevo, Naro-Fominsky District, Moscow Oblast, a village in Volchenkovskoye Rural Settlement of Naro-Fominsky District of Moscow Oblast
Afanasyevo, Bogorodsky District, Nizhny Novgorod Oblast, a selo in Shapkinsky Selsoviet of Bogorodsky District of Nizhny Novgorod Oblast
Afanasyevo, Chkalovsky District, Nizhny Novgorod Oblast, a village in Vershilovsky Selsoviet of Chkalovsky District of Nizhny Novgorod Oblast
Afanasyevo, Semyonov, Nizhny Novgorod Oblast, a village in Ilyino-Zaborsky Selsoviet of the city of oblast significance of Semyonov, Nizhny Novgorod Oblast
Afanasyevo, Smolensk Oblast, a village in Tretyakovskoye Rural Settlement of Dukhovshchinsky District of Smolensk Oblast
Afanasyevo, Aleksinsky District, Tula Oblast, a selo in Plastovsky Rural Okrug of Aleksinsky District of Tula Oblast
Afanasyevo, Venyovsky District, Tula Oblast, a village in Olenkovsky Rural Okrug of Venyovsky District of Tula Oblast
Afanasyevo, Tver Oblast, a village in Kalininsky District of Tver Oblast
Afanasyevo, Alexandrovsky District, Vladimir Oblast, a village in Alexandrovsky District, Vladimir Oblast
Afanasyevo, Sobinsky District, Vladimir Oblast, a village in Sobinsky District, Vladimir Oblast
Afanasyevo, Vyaznikovsky District, Vladimir Oblast, a village in Vyaznikovsky District, Vladimir Oblast

See also
Afanasy
Afanasyev
Afanasyevsky (disambiguation)